The mixed team competition of the ski jumping events at the 2016 Winter Youth Olympics was held on 18 February at the Lysgårdsbakkene Ski Jumping Arena. Each of the 11 teams consists of a female ski jumper, a male Nordic Combined skier and a male ski jumper.

Results 
The first round was started  at 11:00 and the final round at 12:15.

References 

Ski jumping at the 2016 Winter Youth Olympics